Mulgrave is an electoral district of the Legislative Assembly in the Australian state of Queensland.

The district in its present form is a narrow coastal strip running from the southern suburbs of Cairns at its northern end to Innisfail at its southern end. Mulgrave also includes the towns of Gordonvale and Babinda. The electorate was first created for the 1950 election.

There was an earlier district also called Mulgrave that existed from 1873 to 1888. It was based on the town of Bundaberg and was replaced by the new electoral district of Bundaberg by the Electoral Districts Act of 1887.

In 2017 a chunk of the electoral district split from Mulgrave, this area includes Innisfail, Tully and Babinda districts.

Members for Mulgrave

Election results

References

External links
 

Mulgrave